Manuel Ferreira (18 July 1917 – 17 March 1992) was a Portuguese writer that became known for his work which was centered around african culture and literature.

Biography
He took commerce and pharmaceutic courses at the lyceums.  He graduated in Social Sciences at the Technical University of Lisbon.

During his military service, he was mobilized on an expeditionary journey to Cape Verde, in 1941, he was stationed there for six years until 1947.  In the city of Mindelo on the island of São Vicente, he lived with Cape Verdean intellectual groups who worked in the reviews Claridade and Certeza.

He married the Cape Verdean writer Orlanda Amarílis and raised two children Sérgio Manuel Napoleão Ferreira who was born in Cape Verde and Hernâni Donaldo Napoleão Ferreira who was born in Goa.

After being stationed in Cape Verde, he visited Goa which was in Portuguese India and Angola, he also visited other African countries.  Manuel Ferreira became a profound student of the Portuguese expression culture of its former colonies and was considered, one of the most diverse international circle, a world authority on its material.  Its essay work and fiction by himself - which had denounced the colonial repression by the Fascist regime - it profoundly a marking in his experiences in the former Portuguese colonies where the author lived.

His African literary essays in Portuguese, along with his anthologies of African poetry, were considered essential for the studies of the writers of creation.  Whether for keeping his literary work, or for differences in African literature in the Portuguese language, he was considered as the African writer of Portuguese expression, which refers to a great universality of the language by Camões.

Manuel Ferreira published a fictional short story titled Grei in 1944, later he published a novel A Casa dos Motas in 1950, works which forms a single Neorealist sense that makes u the most important movement in contemporary Portuguese literature.  It had his works that had African inspiration who assumed the identical profile.

Other than his Romanesque and essay works, a part of his work were translated into other languages including English, Ferreira was the same author of children's books.  He was a teacher and scholar in African literature, he published numerous works and founded and headed a review named "África – Literatura, Arte e Cultura" ("Africa - Literature, Arts and Culture") and ALAC editions.  Since the restoration of democracy in Portugal, it was created at the Faculty of Letters of the University of Lisbon, a chair of African Literature in the Portuguese language.  He contributed several Portuguese and foreign periodical publications and with Vértice and Seara Nova, organized, mainly as anthologies in No Reino de Caliban (3 volumes, 1975, 1976 and 1996) and 50 African Poets: Selective Anthologies (50 Poetas Africanos: Antologia Seletiva) in 1989.

He was awarded the Fernão Mendes Pinto prize in 1958 for Morabeza, Ricardo Malheiros Award in 1962 for Hora di Bai and the Cultural Press Award (Prémio da Impresa Cultural) for A Aventura Crioula (A Creole Adventure) in 1967.

In 1988, he was interested in an essay names Que Futuro para a Língua Portuguesa em África?, the African emeritus which "was five" [African nations] that took part "in the principle of its language and a cultural fact", transformed Portuguese into an "orality plan and a writer plan".  "For himself, the future would be like this" A language that is none for all, without a master. And if there is one language, the Portuguese language, there exist different variants: the variant from Guinea-Bissau, the variants from Cape Verde, São Tomé and Príncipe, the variants from Angola, Mozambique Brazil, Galicia, East Timor and the variant from Portugal.  Guinea-Bissau, Angola, Mozambique and East Timor have different languages, Cape Verde and São Tomé and Príncipe have Creole languages, and parts of Brazil speak different languages, Galician is a separate language, the language resembles Portuguese.

In the last years of his life, he was a retired professor at the Faculty of Letters at the University of Lisbon,

Works

Fiction
 Grei (Grey) – 1944, short story, 2nd edition, 1977
 Morna – 1948, Capeverdean shorts, 2nd edition, 1966
 A Casa dos Motas – 1956, novel, second edition, 1977
 Morabeza – 1958, Capeverdean short, 2nd edition with a preface by José Cardoso Pires, 1966
 Morabeza – 1961, two short stories in one book with the same title Morabeza and Os Mandongues de Pudjinho Sena
 Hora di Bai – 1962. Capeverdean novel, 2nd edition, 1963; 3rd edition, 1972
 Voz de Prisão (Voice from the Prison) – 1971, Capeverdean novel, 2nd edition, 1978
 Nostalgia do senhor Lima – short story, 1972
 Terra Trazida – 1972; includes the short stories of Morna and Morabeza, also includes an introduction by the author

Children's literature
 O Sandinó e o Corá – 1964; 2nd edition, 1970
 No tempo em que os animais falavam (At the Time Where Animals Spoked) – 1970
 A Maria Bé e o finório Zé Tomé – 1970; 2nd edition, 1972
 A pulseirinha de oiro – 1971; 2nd edition, 1973
 Vamos contar histórias? – 1971
 Quem pode parar o vento? (Who Had Moved the Wind) – 1972; 2nd edition, 1977
 O gato branco e o gato maltês (The White Cat and the Maltese Cat) – 1977, corresponded to the second edition of  Vamos contar histórias?

Essays and investigations
 A aventura crioula (A Creole Adventure) – 1967; 2nd edition, 1973
 Fabulário do Ultramar (Overseas Fables) – 1962. In Vieira de Almeida and Câmara Cascudo, Grande fabulário de Portugal e Brasil (Great Fables of Portugal and Brazil)
 No reino de Caliban (King of Caliban) – 1975, 1976 e 1996,Volumes I, II e III. Panorama da poesia africana de expressão portuguesa (Panorama on African Poetry with Portuguese Expression), Vol. I (Cabo Verde e Guiné-Bissau); Vol. II (Angola e São Tomé e Príncipe); Vol. III (Moçambique), 1996
 Literatura africana de expressão portuguesa (African Literature of Portuguese Expression) – 1976; review by the Complutense University. Madrid, vol. XXV, no. 103, May–June, 1976
 An unknown Literature: African Writing in Portuguese – 1976. Sep. West African journal of Modern Languages, no. 2, Iladan, Nigéria, set. 1976
 Angola – 1977. In João José Cochofel, Grande dicionário da literatura portuguesa e de teoria literária (Great Portuguese Literature and Literary Theory Dictionary), Volume I
 Literaturas africanas de expressão portuguesa I e II – 1977. Vol. I (Cabo Verde, Guiné-Bissau e São Tomé e Príncipe), Vol. II (Angola e Moçambique)
 Bibliografia das literaturas africanas de língua portuguesa [Bibliography of African Writers in the Portuguese Language] (with Gerald Moser) – 1983; Lisboa: Imprensa Nacional/Casa da Moeda
 Que Futuro para a Língua Portuguesa em África? – uma perspetiva sociocultural [What Future of the Portuguese Language in Africa - a Socio-Cultural Perspective], 1988; ALAC, Linda-a-Velha - 91 p.
 50 Poetas Africanos. Antologia Seletiva [40 African Poets: Selective Anthology] – 1989
 O Discurso no Percurso Africano – 1989, Plátano Editora

Other translated works
 Le pain de l’exode (French translation of Hora di bai), Paris, Casterman,1967
 Morabeza. In Zdenek Hampl, Moderné brazilská portugalská, texty II. University of Prague, Czechoslovakia (now the Czech Republic)
 Dona Ester, chá das cinco. In Andreas Klotsch, Erkundungen, Berlin, 1973
 Nostalgia do senhor Lima. Russian translation in Contistas portugueses modernos, 1977
 Tarde de domingo em casa de amigos. Polish translation in Antologia de contistas portugueses, 1977, e revista Literatura na Swicie, n.º 1 (69), Warsaw, January, 1977
 Representação in Skordefolket och andra barattelser, anthological volume of the Portuguese novel, illustrated and translated into Swedish by Arne Lundgren,  Editora Fórum, 1977

References

External links
Manuel Ferreira article at Encyclopædia Britannica

1917 births
1992 deaths
Portuguese male writers
People from Leiria
Cape Verdean literature